Carlos Hurtado Ruíz-Tagle (born 17 February 1937) is a Chilean politician who served as minister of State under Patricio Aylwin's government of the early 1990s. Previously, in 1970, he was a coordinator of Jorge Alessandri's failed campaign for the presidency in the presidential elections of that year.

In 2009, he replaced  Sebastián Piñera as president of Chilevisión when Pinñera stepped down to run for president.

References

External links
 Hurtado's files at the Chilean National Congress Library

1937 births

Living people
20th-century Chilean economists
National Party (Chile, 1966) politicians
University of Chile alumni
Harvard University alumni
20th-century Chilean politicians
Chilean Ministers of Public Works
People from Santiago